Melvin Schwartz (November 2, 1932 – August 28, 2006) was an American physicist. He shared the 1988 Nobel Prize in Physics with Leon M. Lederman and Jack Steinberger for their development of the neutrino beam method and their demonstration of the doublet structure of the leptons through the discovery of the muon neutrino.

Biography
He was Jewish. He grew up in New York City in the Great Depression and went to the Bronx High School of Science. His interest in physics began there at the age of 12.

He earned his B.A. (1953) and Ph.D. (1958) at Columbia University, where Nobel laureate I. I. Rabi was the head of the physics department. Schwartz became an assistant professor at Columbia in 1958.  He was promoted to associate professor in 1960 and  full professor in 1963.  Tsung-Dao Lee, a Columbia colleague who had recently won the Nobel prize at age 30, inspired the experiment for which Schwartz received his Nobel.  Schwartz and his colleagues performed the experiments which led to their Nobel Prize in the early 1960s, when all three were on the Columbia faculty.  The experiment was carried out at the nearby Brookhaven National Laboratory.

In 1966, after 17 years at Columbia, he moved west to Stanford University, where SLAC, a new accelerator, was just being completed. There, he was involved in research investigating the charge asymmetry in the decay of long-lived neutral kaons and another project which produced and detected relativistic hydrogen-like atoms made up of a pion and a muon.

In the 1970s he founded and became president of Digital Pathways. In 1972 he published a textbook on classical electrodynamics that has become a standard reference for intermediate and advanced students for its particularly clear exposition of the basic physical principles of the theory. In 1991, he became Associate Director of High Energy and Nuclear Physics at Brookhaven National Laboratory. At the same time, he rejoined the Columbia faculty as Professor of Physics. He became I. I. Rabi Professor of Physics in 1994 and retired as Rabi Professor Emeritus in 2000.  He spent his retirement years in Ketchum, Idaho, and died August 28, 2006 at a Twin Falls, Idaho, nursing home after struggling with Parkinson's disease and hepatitis C.

Awards and honors
 The Nobel Prize in Physics (1988)
 Golden Plate Award of the American Academy of Achievement (1989)

Publications
Samios, N. P., Plano, R., Prodell, A., Schwartz, M. and J. Steinberger.  "The Parity of the Neutral Pion and the Decay pi{sup 0} Yields 2e{sup +} + 2e{sup -}", Nevis Cyclotron Laboratory, Columbia University, United States Department of Energy (through predecessor agency the Atomic Energy Commission), Office of Naval Research, (January 1962).
Lee, T. D., Robinson, H., Schwartz, M. and R. Cool.  "Intensity of Upward Muon Flux Due to Cosmic-Ray Neutrinos Produced in the Atmosphere", Nevis Cyclotron Laboratory, Columbia University, United States Department of Energy (through predecessor agency the Atomic Energy Commission), (June 1963).
Franzini, P., Leontic, B., Rahm, D., Samios, N. and M. Schwartz.  "Search for Massive Particles Produced in Interactions at 30 BeV", Brookhaven National Laboratory, Columbia University, United States Department of Energy (through predecessor agency the Atomic Energy Commission), (January 1965).
G. Danby, J.-M. Gaillard, K.  Goulianos, L.M. Lederman, N.B.Mistry, M. Schwartz, J. Steinberger (1962). "Observation of high-energy neutrino reactions and the existence of two kinds of neutrinos." Physical Review Letters 9:36

References

External links

1988 Nobel Physics winners
  including the Nobel Lecture, December 8, 1988 The First High Energy Neutrino Experiment

1932 births
2006 deaths
People from Ketchum, Idaho
Nobel laureates in Physics
American Nobel laureates
Columbia University faculty
The Bronx High School of Science alumni
Columbia College (New York) alumni
Columbia Graduate School of Arts and Sciences alumni
Experimental physicists
Jewish American scientists
Jewish physicists
Deaths from Parkinson's disease
Infectious disease deaths in Idaho
Neurological disease deaths in Idaho
Brookhaven National Laboratory Nobel laureates
Members of the United States National Academy of Sciences
Fellows of the American Physical Society
Particle physicists
Deaths from hepatitis